Gombe State Polytechnic, Bajoga is a Polytechnic located at Bajoga Funakaye LGA of Gombe State.

History 
The institution was established from the decision of the State Government which is in tandem with the recommendation agreed on by High-Powered committee on Education on 27 September 2012. Gombe State Polytechnic Bajoga started with two hundred and fifty six (256)  pioneering students, and it offers Pre-National Diploma and National Diploma  in courses at undergraduate levels.

The school was established  in order to bridge the education gap in the state. Therefore, the school is expected to integrate academic, technical and vocational education as benchmarks for the development of the state.

Schools 
The polytechnic has the following schools:

 School of Engineering and Engineering Technology
 School of Science and Technology
 School of Management Studies
 School of General Studies

Rector 
Engr. Aliyu Muhammad Gadam

References

External links 
 https://gspb.edu.ng/

Schools in Gombe State
Universities and colleges in Nigeria